Fred Whicker (1901–1966) was an Australian-born artist who moved to Britain in the 1930s.

Works of art in public collections
Falmouth Art Gallery holds a number of works by Whicker. He is also represented in the collections of The Royal Society of Physicians and University of Oxford.

References

 https://cornwallartists.org/cornwall-artists/fred-whicker
 https://www.louisekosman.com/artists/artist_623.php

British artists
1901 births
1966 deaths
Austrian emigrants to the United Kingdom